William Robert Bradley was a British and South African boxer. He fought as Bill Bradley. He competed in the men's middleweight event at the 1920 Summer Olympics.

Bradley won the 1913 A.B.A. Middleweight Championship of Britain, fighting under the Bermondsey Catholic ABC.

References

Year of birth missing
Year of death missing
Middleweight boxers
South African male boxers
Olympic boxers of South Africa
Boxers at the 1920 Summer Olympics
Place of birth missing